This is a summary of 2005 in music in the United Kingdom, including the official charts. Average sales for a number-one single were 80,437 per week.

Prominent music genres included girlgroup pop, with the success of Sugababes and Girls Aloud, as well as Rock, Indie Rock and Soul.

Elvis Presley broke the record for the most UK number-one singles. Arctic Monkeys helped a continued resurgence of Indie Rock music, as part of the post-punk revival scene scoring two UK No1 singles in 2005, including I Bet You Look Good on the Dancefloor.

Summary
The first number one of the year, displacing Band Aid 20's "Do They Know It's Christmas?", was Steve Brookstein with his cover version of Phil Collins' "Against All Odds".

To celebrate the 70th anniversary of his birth, one of Elvis Presley's eighteen Number One singles were released each week from January until May. The first, "Jailhouse Rock", entered at Number One in early January.  The second, "One Night", was the 1000th number-one single in the UK charts, and also set the record for being the lowest-selling weekly sale ever to reach the top spot.  The run did not extend to a third week with "A Fool Such As I" only making number two, having been beaten by the debut release by Ciara.  Elvis returned to the top spot in the fourth week, with "It's Now or Never".

The Scissor Sisters topped the album chart in the second week of 2005 having had a very successful 2004.  Their eponymous album Scissor Sisters was released on 9 February 2004 and went on to sell 1,594,000 copies by the end of that year.

On 14 January pop band Busted announced that they were to split. The band had released two albums and topped the singles chart four times.

The Chemical Brothers topped the album and download charts with Push the Button and "Galvanize", respectively, with the single reaching the top ten. Keane returned to the top of the chart in the second week of February due to their success at the BRIT Awards, while on 6 February, Eminem got his sixth number one with "Like Toy Soldiers", making him the most successful rap artist in the UK singles chart.

On 6 March, Stereophonics earned their first number-one single with "Dakota", the first single to be taken from their new album, Language. Sex. Violence. Other?, which topped the album chart two weeks later.

The Comic Relief single of the year, the double A-side of "All About You" and "You've Got a Friend" by McFly, reached the top of the chart on 13 March.  It was knocked off by a second Comic Relief single – a reissue of Tony Christie's "Is This the Way to Amarillo" with the associated video seeing comedian Peter Kay mime alongside various guest stars. Tony Christie topped the singles, album and download chart. The song spent seven weeks at the top of the singles charts, the longest stay at number 1 since Cher's "Believe" in 1998. On its original release in 1971, the song had charted no higher than No. 18.

On 29 May, Damon Albarn's Gorillaz topped the album charts with Demon Days. The following week, Gorillaz were knocked off the top by Albarn's former Britpop rivals Oasis who in turn were knocked off the top by Coldplay's eagerly awaited X&Y, which was met with mixed reviews itself. It was the second fastest album on first week sales only, second only to Oasis' 1997 release, Be Here Now.

Headliners at the major festivals included: The Foo Fighters and Green Day at T in the Park; Faithless, Morrissey and R.E.M. at the Isle of Wight Festival; Feeder, Black Sabbath and System of a Down at the Download Festival; Scissor Sisters and Oasis at V Festival; Basement Jaxx and Faithless at Creamfields; New Order, Basement Jaxx, Keane and Kasabian at the Wireless Festival; Foo Fighters, Pixies and Iron Maiden at the Carling Weekend, while Glastonbury seen White Stripes, Coldplay and Basement Jaxx headline.

On 17 July 2005 James Blunt's single "You're Beautiful" went to number one six weeks after its release, having been in the top 15 for all the previous weeks.  His album Back To Bedlam had hit the top spot the week previous. After five weeks at the top, he was then replaced by McFly, who scored their fourth chart topper with I'll Be OK, the second release from their second album Wonderland which was to also top the album chart, making them the youngest band ever to have scored two UK number-one albums.

Oasis then followed up their May chart topper Lyla with a second, The Importance of Being Idle, which would be their final number one before their break up in 2009. Gorillaz then scored their first (and to date only) number 1 when Dare, featuring the vocals of Happy Mondays singer Shaun Ryder topped the chart for a week. Pussycat Dolls reached number 1 on 11 September with Don't Cha, becoming the first American girl band to top the charts since Destiny's Child in 2001. Their next release, Stickwitu, would also top the chart for two weeks in early December.

After a year's break, Sugababes returned to the top of the charts for the fourth time with the release of Push the Button, and their fourth studio LP Taller in More Ways. These releases along with the album's second single Ugly would prove to be their last with Mutya Buena, who departed from the band that December to be replaced by Amelle Berrabah. The Arctic Monkeys entered the UK mainstream when their debut single, "I Bet You Look Good on the Dancefloor", went in at Number One on 23 October, beating the new single by Robbie Williams and knocking the Sugababes off the top.

Robbie Williams' new album Intensive Care set a new record when it topped the UK album chart on 30 October, with British acts occupying the number-one spot in the album chart for 25 consecutive weeks. The previous record, set in March 1990, was 24 weeks.

Kate Bush returned to the music world after a 12-year absence with the single "King of the Mountain", which became her biggest UK hit in 20 years by reaching No. 4, and was followed on 7 November by the acclaimed double album Aerial, which reached No. 3 and was certified platinum.

In the latter part of the year, the album chart was dominated by the usual range of 'greatest hits' packages, the most successful being Eminem's Curtain Call: The Hits, which topped the chart for four weeks in December and sold around nearly a million copies by early 2006. Mariah Carey also had success with her Greatest Hits album. Madonna also launched another successful comeback, spending three weeks at number one with her single "Hung Up". The coveted Christmas number one spot was taken by The X Factor winner Shayne Ward, who comfortably beat surprise contenders Nizlopi and the charity re-release of "Fairytale of New York". His single, "That's My Goal", became one of the quickest selling songs ever, with over 742,180 copies sold in just four days. Eminem continues to dominate in the albums chart with Curtain Call: The Hits reaching #1 for 5 weeks and selling around a million in the UK.

Chart calculation change
On 17 April, the first combined physical and downloaded singles sales chart was published, in an attempt by the record industry to boost flagging singles sales.  It was suggested that this might make a significant impact on the demographics of chart as 96% of people downloading from the Internet at the time were male.

Charts

Number-one singles

Number-one downloads

Number-one albums

Number-one compilation albums

Year-end charts
Between 2 January and 31 December 2005.

Best-selling singles

Best-selling albums

Best-selling compilation albums

Top 10 downloads of 2005

Notes:

See also
List of UK Dance Singles Chart number ones of 2005
List of UK Independent Singles Chart number ones of 2005
List of UK Rock & Metal Singles Chart number ones of 2005

References

United Kingdom
Charts, 2005 In British Music
British record charts